The Neighbourhood (sometimes rendered as "THE NBHD") is an American rock band formed in Newbury Park, California, in 2011. The band is composed of vocalist Jesse Rutherford, guitarists Jeremy Freedman and Zach Abels, and bassist Mikey Margott. After releasing two EPs, I'm Sorry... and Thank You, the Neighbourhood released its first full-length album I Love You. on April 23, 2013, via Columbia Records. The album was preceded by their 2012 single "Sweater Weather"—their sole single to appear on the Billboard Hot 100, peaking at number 14 in 2013 and resurging in popularity a decade later through radio airplay, TikTok, and Spotify.

The same year, the EP The Love Collection was released; and in November 2014, a mixtape titled #000000 & #FFFFFF. A second album, Wiped Out! was released on October 30, 2015. On March 9, 2018, a self-titled third studio album came out, preceded by the release of two EPs: Hard on September 22, 2017, which briefly charted on the Billboard 200, and To Imagine on January 12, 2018. After the release of the album, the tracks from the extended plays not included on the final track listing were collected in another EP, Hard to Imagine. The album, Hard to Imagine, and another EP Ever Changing, were further merged into the LP Hard to Imagine The Neighbourhood Ever Changing. On February 22, 2022, it was reported that the band are taking a hiatus.

History

Formation and I Love You. (2011–2013)
The Neighbourhood was formed in August 2011 by the singer Jesse Rutherford, guitarists Zachary Abels and Jeremiah Freedman, bass guitarist Michael Margott and drummer Bryan "Olivver" Sammis. The members of The Neighbourhood chose the British spelling of "neighbourhood" on the advice of their manager, in order to distinguish themselves from a band already using the American spelling, hence the song names also using the British spelling.

In early 2012, the Neighbourhood released "Female Robbery" and "Sweater Weather". In May 2012, the band unveiled their debut self-released extended play titled I'm Sorry... for free download, produced by Justyn Pilbrow. In December 2012, the Neighbourhood released their second EP, Thank You,.

The band performed at Coachella in 2013, anticipating their debut album I Love You., which was premiered on April 16, 2013, via Rolling Stone and officially released on April 23, 2013, via Columbia Records. It debuted at number 39 on the US Billboard 200 albums chart, selling 9,000 units in its first week. It was preceded by the lead single "Sweater Weather", which music video was released on March 5, 2013. They made their first televised performance of the song on June 27, 2013, at Jimmy Kimmel Live. "Sweater Weather" topped the charts in early June 2013, reaching number one on Billboard Alternative Songs chart and breaking the top ten on Billboard Heatseekers Songs chart.

The band went on tour opening for Imagine Dragons in July and September 2013. The Neighbourhood also made two appearances in Eastern Canada during the summer of 2013. They played as one of the headliners of Toronto's Edgefest on July 31, 2013, and then a few days later played at Canada's largest music festival, Osheaga, in Montreal on August 4. The Neighbourhood performed at Atlanta's Music Midtown on September 21, 2013.

#000000 & #FFFFFF  and Wiped Out! (2014–2015)
On January 16, 2014, the band revealed via social media that drummer Bryan Sammis was leaving the band.

In April 2013, the Neighbourhood announced their summer 2013 tour called The Love Collection Tour along with Lovelife, the 1975, and JMSN. as well as that they were planning the release of a mixtape. On December 10, 2013, they released a new EP called The Love Collection. On November 28, 2014, the band finally released the project, titled #000000 & #FFFFFF (the hexadecimal color codes for black and white, respectively) for free. It was hosted by DJ Drama and features guest appearances by YG, Dej Loaf, French Montana, Danny Brown, G-Eazy and others. The mixtape was officially released for streaming and download on November 22, 2017.

In August 2015, the band announced the upcoming October 30 release of their second album Wiped Out!. It was preceded by the lead single "R.I.P. 2 My Youth" and reached the number 13 position on the US Billboard 200. The band embarked on a European tour in November 2015 and on an American tour in May and June 2016 to support the album.

Hard to Imagine, self-titled album, Chip Chrome & the Mono-Tones and hiatus (2017–present) 
On September 21, 2017, the Neighbourhood released the EP Hard, which reached number 183 on the US Billboard 200 chart. Another EP called To Imagine was released on January 12, 2018. The band later announced their self-titled third studio album The Neighbourhood, released March 9, 2018, which included tracks from the previous extended plays, including the lead single "Scary Love". After the release, the tracks from the extended plays that were not included on the final tracklisting were collected in another EP called Hard to Imagine. The band then released the complete edition of the album, titled Hard to Imagine the Neighbourhood Ever Changing which featured all songs released from Hard, To Imagine, The Neighbourhood, and Ever Changing, except the two tracks "Revenge" and "Too Serious". 

On August 16, 2019, they premiered a music video along with their single, "Middle of Somewhere". On October 10, 2019, the Neighbourhood's single, "Yellow Box" was released and featured on an action game, Death Stranding. They released a lyric video for "Yellow Box" on November 7, 2019.

On July 31, 2020, the band announced the September 25 release of their fourth album Chip Chrome & the Mono-Tones. It was preceded by a single "Cherry Flavoured", which they released in a playlist named after the album via various streaming services. The playlist is a compilation of the band's essential songs, plus the single. In description of the playlist was, quote: "Album out 9/25".

In late 2020, their songs "Sweater Weather", from their album I Love You. and "Daddy Issues" from their album, Wiped Out!, went viral on TikTok, garnering new streaming highs.

In February 2022, the band announced that they would be taking a hiatus.

On November 13, 2022, the band announced on social media that drummer Brandon Fried would no longer be in the Neighbourhood after Marías lead vocalist María Zardoya accused him of sexual assault.

Musical style
The Neighbourhood's musical style has been described as alternative rock, indie rock, indie pop, pop rock, with elements of electronic, hip hop, pop, and R&B.

Members
Current members
 Jesse Rutherford – lead vocals (2011–present)
 Zachary Abels – lead and rhythm guitar (2011–present), backing vocals (2015–present)
 Jeremiah Freedman – rhythm and lead guitar, backing vocals (2011–present)
 Michael Margott – bass guitar (2011–present), backing vocals (2015–present)

Former members
 Bryan "Olivver" Sammis – drums, percussion, backing vocals (2011–2014)
 Brandon Fried – drums, percussion, backing vocals (2014–2022)

Timeline

Discography

Albums

Studio albums

Reissued albums

Extended plays

Mixtapes

Singles

Promotional singles

Other charted and certified songs

Other appearances

Music videos

Notes

References

External links

2011 establishments in California
Alternative rock groups from California
Columbia Records artists
Indie pop groups from Los Angeles
Musical groups established in 2011
Musical quintets
People from Thousand Oaks, California